Hinds is a small town in the Mid-Canterbury region of New Zealand's South Island. It is located on the Canterbury Plains on the south bank of the Hinds River, which reaches the Pacific Ocean between the nearby localities of Longbeach and Lowcliffe. Other localities around Hinds include Ealing to the west, Willowby, Windermere, and Winslow to the northeast, and Eiffelton to the southeast.

Naming
The township and the surrounding district are named after the Hinds River. The river in turn was named after the Reverend Samuel Hinds, a member of the Canterbury Association that organised the settlement of Canterbury.

History
State Highway 1 and the Main South Line railway pass through Hinds. Passenger trains have not regularly operated through Hinds since the cancellation of the daily Southerner service on 10 February 2002, but freight trains run multiple times every day. The town also has a primary school; it dates from 1881 and the original classrooms are still in use. The school's size was boosted in the 1930s when rural schools in Ealing, Maronan, and Lynnford were closed and their students sent to Hinds. There were plans to build a secondary school in Hinds, but these never eventuated and the primary school gained land set aside for the secondary school.

In 2011 with the closure of the rural school in Lowcliffe their students were sent to Hinds.

Demographics
It is part of the Ealing-Lowcliffe statistical area.

Hinds had a population of 291 at the 2018 New Zealand census, a decrease of 9 people (-3.0%) since the 2013 census, and an increase of 9 people (3.2%) since the 2006 census. There were 114 households. There were 153 males and 138 females, giving a sex ratio of 1.11 males per female, with 57 people (19.6%) aged under 15 years, 54 (18.6%) aged 15 to 29, 150 (51.5%) aged 30 to 64, and 36 (12.4%) aged 65 or older.

Ethnicities were 90.7% European/Pākehā, 14.4% Māori, 2.1% Pacific peoples, 2.1% Asian, and 1.0% other ethnicities (totals add to more than 100% since people could identify with multiple ethnicities).

Although some people objected to giving their religion, 55.7% had no religion, 30.9% were Christian, 2.1% were Hindu, 1.0% were Muslim and 2.1% had other religions.

Of those at least 15 years old, 9 (3.8%) people had a bachelor or higher degree, and 75 (32.1%) people had no formal qualifications. The employment status of those at least 15 was that 129 (55.1%) people were employed full-time, 39 (16.7%) were part-time, and 12 (5.1%) were unemployed.

Education
Hinds School is a full primary school catering for years 1 to 8. It has  students as of  The school opened in 1881.

References 

Ashburton District
Populated places in Canterbury, New Zealand